The Ministry of Casimir de Rochechouart de Mortemart was announced on 29 July 1830 by King Charles X of France during the last day of the Bourbon Restoration.
Later that day the ministry was replaced by the Paris Municipal Commission.

Ministers

The ministers were:

Later that day the deputies who remained present in Paris met at Lafitte's house and named an interim Municipal Commission composed of Jacques Laffitte, Casimir Pierre Périer, Georges Mouton, Auguste de Schonen, Pierre-François Audry de Puyraveau and François Mauguin. General Lafayette was appointed commander of the National Guard.
On 31 July 1830 the Municipal Commission named the ministers, called provisional commissioners, of the Paris Municipal Commission Ministry.

References
Citations

Sources

French governments
1830 in France
1830 establishments in France
1830 disestablishments in France
Cabinets established in 1830
Cabinets disestablished in 1830